On 16 February 2019, armed men attacked and killed two Frontier Corps in Loralai. Later on 17 February 2019, another attack took place on Pakistani security personnel in which four members of the Frontier Corps were killed in the Gardab area of Panjgur District..The attack was carried out by the Baloch Raji Ajoi Sangar (BRAS), an alliance of three Balochi terrorist organizations, the Baloch Liberation Army, Balochistan Liberation Front and Baloch Republican Guard.

These attacks were preceded by the January 2019 Loralai attack in Balochistan in which eight policemen and a civilian were killed by gunmen and suicide bombers affiliated with Tehrik-i-Taliban Pakistan on 29 January 2019.

The attack happened hours before Saudi Arabia's Prince Mohammed bin Salman made his visit to Pakistan.

Reaction
Jamal Kamal Khan, the Chief Minister of Balochistan, condemned the attack and accused it of being as "a conspiracy against region's development".

See also
 2019 Ghotki riots
 2014 Larkana temple attack
 2009 Gojra riots

References 

February attacks
2019 mass shootings in Asia
2019 murders in Pakistan
February 2019 attacks
21st-century mass murder in Pakistan 
February 2019
February 2019 crimes in Asia
February 2019 events in Pakistan
Loralai District
Mass murder in 2019
February 2019 attacks
Mass shootings in Pakistan 
Panjgur District
February 2019 attacks
Terrorist incidents in Pakistan in 2019
Deaths by firearm in Balochistan, Pakistan